Brad Myers may refer to:

 Brad Myers (American football) (born 1929), American football player
 Brad Myers (guitarist) (born 1975), jazz guitarist and producer
 Brad A. Myers, American computer scientist